Tusaş Engine Industries (TEI) is an aerospace engine manufacturer and a design center for the production of engines and engine parts for commercial and military aircraft. It is based in Eskişehir, Turkey.

TEI was founded in 1985 as a joint venture between GE Aviation and Turkish Aerospace Industries (TAI), the Turkish Armed Forces Foundation, and the Turkish Aeronautical Association.

History
The company started with component manufacturing for the General Electric F110 engines in the F-16 aircraft of the Turkish Air Force.

Products and projects

Indigenous engines
TEI TS1400 turboshaft aviation engine for rotary wing applications such as the TAI T625 Gökbey, T-129 ATAK
 TEI-PD170 turbodiesel aviation engines for the TAI Anka UAVs
TEI-PD222ST turbodiesel aviation engine
TEI-PG50 2-stroke gasoline aviation engine
TEI-PG50S 2-stroke gasoline aviation engine
TEI-TJ300 turbojet medium range anti-ship missile engine
TEI-TJ90 turbojet engine for UAVs, including TAI Şimşek target drone 
TEI-TJ35 turbojet engine
TEI-TP38 turboprop engine
 An engine to power the TAI TF-X
 TEI-TF6000 turbofan engine

Licensed engines
 General Electric T700 (T700-TEI-701D variant) for the T-70, a local variant of the S-70 Black Hawk
 General Electric F110 engines
 LHTEC T800 turboshaft engines for rotary wing applications such as the T-129 Atak

Parts and modules
 CFM International LEAP
 General Electric GEnx
 CFM International CFM56
 General Electric GE90
 General Electric GE9X
 General Electric T700 (T700-TEI-701D variant)
 Also for many other engines

References

Aircraft manufacturers of Turkey
Government-owned companies of Turkey
Manufacturing companies established in 1985
Science and technology in Turkey
Aerospace companies
Defence companies of Turkey
Ministry of National Defense (Turkey)
Turkish brands
Turkish companies established in 1985
Aircraft engine manufacturers of Turkey
Companies based in Eskişehir